Nullosetigeridae is a family of copepods belonging to the order Calanoida.

Genera:
 Nullosetigera Soh, Ohtsuka, Imabayashi & Suh, 1999

References

Copepods